Sandy Wexler is a 2017 American comedy film directed by Steve Brill and written by Dan Bulla, Paul Sado and Adam Sandler. The film stars Sandler, Jennifer Hudson, Kevin James, Terry Crews, Rob Schneider, Colin Quinn, and Lamorne Morris, and follows a talent manager in 1990s Hollywood. The film was released on Netflix on April 14, 2017.

Plot
In 1994, Sandy Wexler is a talent manager working in Los Angeles. He has a reputation for having an extremely eccentric personality and for often telling huge lies to sound more important than he really is, resulting in his clients never finding success except for his first, a man named Alfred. His current clientele include Ted Rafferty, a ventriloquist, Kevin Conners, a comedian, Amy Baskin, an actress, Gary Rogers, a daredevil, and Bobby Barnes, a wrestler.

While at Six Flags, Sandy sees a young woman, Courtney Clarke, performing in a stage show. Immediately entranced by both her voice and her beauty, he convinces her that he can make her a star. She records several singles that become hits, but his antics continue to cause her trouble. Eventually, her boyfriend, rapper Bling, convinces Sandy that his presence is a hindrance to Courtney's potential fame and he resigns as her manager.

While Sandy continues to struggle with both his feelings for Courtney and his clients, Courtney grows more and more famous, eventually winning a Grammy. Bobby soon sees success when Sandy helps him become champ, while Courtney, feeling unsatisfied with her fame, spirals into drinking and a string of failed relationships. She seeks comfort with Sandy, but their one night stand goes nowhere. She eventually tells him that she's quitting the business and leaving to get married.

Depressed by Courtney's decision, Sandy acts out worse than ever, which costs him all his clients except Ted. While back at Six Flags, he meets Alfred, finally revealed to be Weird Al Yankovic. Al convinces Sandy to stop telling people what he thinks they want to hear and, instead, tell them the truth. To this end, he has his landlord bring Courtney to Griffith Observatory, where he admits his feelings to her, which she reciprocates, and they're married in a ceremony officiated by one of Ted's puppets.

Sandy's newfound honesty also gets him back his clients as well as many new ones. After twenty years, Courtney and Sandy are married for real.

Cast
 Adam Sandler as Sandy Wexler
 Jennifer Hudson as Courtney Clarke
 Kevin James as Ted Rafferty
 Terry Crews as "Bedtime" Bobby Barnes
 Shad Gaspard as "Bedtime" Bobby Barnes (in-ring)
 Rob Schneider as Firuz		
 Colin Quinn as Kevin Connors
 Nick Swardson as Gary Rodgers
 Lamorne Morris as Bling	
 Arsenio Hall as himself
 Aaron Neville as Willy Clarke
 Jane Seymour as Cindy Marvelle
 Sandy Wernick as Peter Marvelle
 Wayne Federman as Eric Lamonsoff
 Jackie Sandler as Amy Baskin
 Luis Guzmán as Oscar
 Rob Reiner as Marty Markowitz
 Chris Elliott as Mr. Buttons
 Ido Mosseri as Yuri
 Milo Ventimiglia as Barry Bubatzi
 Eugenio Derbez as Ramiro Alejandro
 Jessica Lowe as Ms. Gideon
 Allen Covert as Gurvy
 Jonathan Loughran as Trucker Jon
 Kate Micucci as Nurse Trisha
 Jared Sandler as Jared

Cameo roles include Clay Aiken, Jewel, Darius Rucker, Jason Priestley, Gary Dell'Abate, Arsenio Hall, Quincy Jones, Judd Apatow, Janeane Garofalo, Pauly Shore, Kevin Nealon, Lorne Michaels, Dana Carvey, Chris Rock, David Spade, George Wendt, Penn Jillette, Henry Winkler, Tony Orlando, Al B. Sure!, Brian McKnight, Vanilla Ice, Jimmy Kimmel, Conan O'Brien, Louie Anderson, "Weird Al" Yankovic, Kenneth "Babyface" Edmonds, Mason "Ma$e" Betha, Jay Leno, Lisa Loeb, Jon Lovitz, Budd Friedman and his wife Alix Friedman.

Mike Judge makes a vocal cameo as Beavis and Butt-Head during the end credits. Professional wrestlers Rikishi and David Otunga have brief roles in the film.

Production
On July 20, 2016, Jennifer Hudson joined the cast of the film, and on July 26, 2016, Kevin James, Terry Crews, Rob Schneider, Colin Quinn, Nick Swardson, Lamorne Morris and Arsenio Hall joined as well. Principal photography began on August 2, 2016.

The Wexler character is a satirical homage to Sandler's real-life manager Sandy Wernick.

Release
The film was released worldwide on Netflix on April 14, 2017.

Critical response
On Rotten Tomatoes, Sandy Wexler has an approval rating of 27% based on 22 reviews, with an average rating of 4.11/10. The site's critical consensus reads, "Sandy Wexler marks a mild improvement from the Adam Sandler vehicles immediately preceding it – which in no way serves as an endorsement for non-hardcore fans." On Metacritic, the film has a weighted average score 40 out of 100, based on 8 critics, indicating "mixed or average reviews".

Peter Debruge of Variety called the film "sloppy" and is critical of the 131 minute runtime. Although he appreciates the concept of the film as a comedy roast, Debruge complains that the film is not funny enough. In his review of Sandy Wexler, film critic Brian Tallerico wrote that the film "sucks" and that "Brill and Sandler never wrote a joke that they didn’t think was worth repeating until you were sick of it."

Some critics have discussed the Jewish angle of the film, which portrays a relationship between a Jewish manager and a black performer.

References

External links
 
 
 

2017 films
2010s English-language films
2017 comedy films
American comedy films
Films directed by Steven Brill
Films produced by Adam Sandler
Films produced by Allen Covert
Films scored by Rupert Gregson-Williams
English-language Netflix original films
Happy Madison Productions films
Films with screenplays by Adam Sandler
Films set in the 1990s
2010s American films